Zelenyi Hai is a village in Uman Raion, Cherkasy Oblast (province) of Ukraine. 

Zelenyi Hai was previously located in the Mankivka Raion. The raion was abolished on 18 July 2020 as part of the administrative reform of Ukraine, which reduced the number of raions of Cherkasy Oblast to four. The area of Mankivka Raion was merged into Uman Raion.

References

Notes

Villages in Uman Raion